Heneage Legge may refer to:

Heneage Legge (died 1759), a Baron of the Exchequer
Heneage Legge (1788–1844), Member of Parliament (MP) for Banbury
Heneage Legge (1845–1911), MP for St George's Hanover Square, nephew of the above